Gábor Böröndi (born 6 April 1971) is a Hungarian military officer.

Böröndi was promoted to the position of the Deputy Chief of the General Staff by President János Áder, as a Lieutenant General on January 1 2019.

Career 
1992 – 1996 MH 26th Mechanized Infantry Brigade "János Bottyán"

1996 – 1999 MH 4th Mechanized Corps Command, Székesfehérvár

1999 – 2006 Ministry of Defence, Budapest

2006 – 2013  MH 5th Infantry Brigade "István Bocskai", Debrecen

2013 – 2017 MH Forces Command, Székesfehérvár

2018 – 2019  Ministry of Defence, General Staff, Budapest

2019 – Deputy Chief of the General Staff

References 

1971 births
Living people